Jennifer Pahlka (born 27 December 1969) is the founder and former Executive Director of Code for America. She served as US Deputy Chief Technology Officer from June 2013 to June 2014 and helped found the United States Digital Service. Previously she had worked at CMP Media with various roles in the computer game industry. She  was the co-chair and general manager of the Web 2.0 conferences.

Personal life
She was born in Port Deposit, Maryland, and raised in Austin, New Haven, and New York City. She is a graduate of the Bronx High School of Science and Yale University. She married Tim O'Reilly in 2015, and lives in Oakland, California, with her daughter and husband.

Career
Pahlka spent eight years at CMP Media (now part of United Business Media), where she led the Game Group, responsible for the Game Developers Conference (GDC), Game Developer Magazine, and Gamasutra.com. She oversaw the dramatic growth of GDC from 1995 to 2003, and launched the Independent Games Festival and the Game Developers Choice Awards. She was also the executive director of the International Game Developers Association (IGDA), an independent non-profit association serving game developers around the world.

From 2005 to 2009, she was the co-chair and general manager of the Web 2.0 events for TechWeb, a division of United Business Media, in partnership with O'Reilly Media. In that role, she proposed the creation of the Web 2.0 Expo, and became the co-chair for the event. She also played a key role in managing the Gov 2.0 Summit and Gov 2.0 Expo.

Code for America
Pahlka founded Code for America, a San Francisco-based non-profit organization that aims to make government for all people. According to the Washington Post it "is the technology world’s equivalent of the Peace Corps or Teach for America… [offering] an alternative to the old, broken path of government IT." In her 2012 TED Talk, Pahlka noted that we will not be able to reinvent government unless we also reinvent citizenship, and asked "Are we just going to be a crowd of voices, or are we going to be a crowd of hands?" 

Pahlka stepped down as executive director of Code for America on January 31, 2020, though remaining as an advisor and member of the Board of Directors.

United States Deputy Chief Technology Officer
In May 2013 Pahlka announced she was temporarily taking the position of deputy chief technology officer for government innovation for the US government's Office of Science and Technology Policy. She described the opportunity as her "own fellowship year of sorts." Federal CTO Todd Park originally tried to recruit Pahlka to run the Presidential Innovation Fellows, a program loosely modeled on Code for America. In her role as Deputy US CTO she managed Round 2 of the program and organized the creation of Round 3, but her principal goal during her year at the White House was to create something more equivalent to the UK's Government Digital Service. She set in motion the creation of the United States Digital Service within the Executive Office of the President.

United States Digital Response
In March 2020, Pahlka co-founded United States Digital Response, a San Francisco-based non-profit organization to provide technology volunteers to state and local governments whose systems were unable to respond adequately to the new demands put on them by the Covid-19 pandemic. The organization has fielded thousands of volunteers.

California Employment Development Department Strike Team
In July 2020, California Governor Gavin Newsom appointed Pahlka to co-lead a strike team with California Government Operations Secretary Yolanda Richardson to make recommendations for modernizing the state's backlogged unemployment systems. The strike team issued its report in September 2020. Among the problems uncovered by the Strike Team was that poorly designed and outdated fraud protection techniques were denying benefits to millions. Minor discrepancies in documentation supplied by applicants, like a middle initial on the application when the full middle name appeared on a supporting document like a driver's license, would cause applications to be flagged for manual review. Adoption of a modern off-the-shelf identity verification system seems to quickly solve the problem.

Recognition
Pahlka was awarded an Internet and Society Award from the Oxford Internet Institute, in recognition of her contribution to digital open government in the US.  For her work re-imagining government for the 21st century, Pahlka was named a 2011 HuffPost Gamechanger. She was a celebrity judge for the Federal Communications Commission's Apps for Community contest, along with Marc Andreessen and Newark Mayor Cory Booker. She was elected an Ashoka Fellow in 2012. In 2012 She also gave a keynote speech at South By Southwest Interactive in 2012. In the same year she featured in TechCrunch's list of "The 20 Most Innovative People in Democracy." In 2018, Pahlka accepted the Skoll Awards for Social Entrepreneurship on behalf of Code for America and she was featured among "America's Top 50 Women In Tech" by Forbes.

East Bay Mini Maker Faire
Pahlka is also a co-founder, with Sabrina Merlo and Corey Weinstein, of the East Bay Mini Maker Faire.  In comments to The Huffington Post, she made explicit the connection between her work on open government and the Maker movement, saying, "There is a certain generation who have grown up being able to mash up, to tinker with, every system they've ever encountered. So they are meeting their relationship with government in a new way, with a new assumption: We can fix it." The East Bay Mini Maker Faire currently attracts around 7,000 people annually.

References

External links

 Code for America official website
 Civic Commons, a project of Code for America
 Changing Government and Tech with Geeks, Nick Bilton, The New York Times, July 6, 2010
 How an Army of Techies Is Taking on City Hall, Anya Kamenetz, Fast Company, November 29, 2010
 Innovator: Jennifer Pahlka, John Tozzi, Business Week, April 7, 2011
 Remaking Government in a Wiki Age, Chrystia Freeland/Reuters, The New York Times, August 18, 2011
 HuffPost's 2011 Game Changers: This Year's Ultimate 12, Arianna Huffington, The Huffington Post, October 26, 2011
 Code For America Receives $1.5M Grant From Google To Help The Government Harness Technology, Leena Rao, Techcrunch, December 14, 2011
 Code for America: An elegant solution for government IT problems, Vivek Wadhwa, The Washington Post, December 18, 2011
 Possum problems and building better government: Jennifer Pahlka at TED2012, TED Blog, February 29, 2012
 Jennifer Pahlka is named one of Government Technology's magazine Top 25: Doers, Dreamers and Drivers of 2012.

Living people
1969 births
Office of Science and Technology Policy officials
People from Port Deposit, Maryland
American computer programmers
Yale University alumni
Video game businesspeople
American technology company founders
American women company founders
American company founders
Ashoka USA Fellows
Ashoka Fellows
21st-century American women